This is a list of notable electronic music record labels:

0–9
3 Beat Records
12k
430 West Records
8bitpeoples

A
A Different Drum
Ad Noiseam
Adjunct Audio
Alex Tronic Records
Alfa Matrix
Alien8
All Around The World
All Saints Records
Amorfon
A-Musik
Anjunabeats
Anticipate Recordings
Apollo Recordings
Arcola
Armada Music
Aropa Records
Artoffact Records
Astralwerks
Asthmatic Kitty
Asylum Records
ATIC Records
Atlantic Jaxx
Audio Dregs
Azuli Records

B
Basic Channel
Beatservice Records
Bedrock Records
Benbecula Records
Big Life 
Bitbird
Black Butter Records
Black Hole Recordings
Blue Room Released
Bonzai Records
BPitch Control
Brainfeeder
Breakbeat Kaos

C
Chalice
Cheap Records
City Centre Offices
Cleopatra Records
Cocoon Recordings
Compuphonic
Cooking Vinyl
Crammed Discs
Cuneiform Records

D
Darkest Labyrinth
Darla Records
Deconstruction Records
Defected
Dependent Records
Deviant Records
DFA Records
Dial Records
Digital Hardcore Recordings
Dim Mak Records
Dimension 
Disques Hushush
Distinctive Records
Dreyfus Records
DSFA Records
Durtro

E
East West (Human League)
Ed Banger Records
Eenie Meenie Records
Emperor Norton Records
Em:t Records
Energy Rekords
Epic Records
Erased Tapes
Ersatz Audio
ESL Music
Exceptional Records
Eye Q

F
Fat Cat Records
Fatal Recordings
FAX +49-69/450464
FCommunications
FFRR 
Finger Lickin' Records
Fitamin Un
FiXT Music
Flashover Recordings
Fly Eye Records
Fool's Gold Records
Freakdance Records
Fringe Product
Fueradeserie!

G
Garuda
Geffen Records
Get Physical Music
Ghost Box Music
Ghostly International
Glasgow Underground Recordings
Good Looking Records
Gooom Disques
Grand Central Records
Gravitas Recordings

H
Hallucination Recordings
Harthouse
Heavenly
Hed Kandi
Hefty Records
Hippos in Tanks
Hospital Records
Hotflush Recordings
Hyperdub
Hyperium Records
Hypnos

I
Illegal Art
Imputor?
Incentive Records
INCredible
Innova Recordings
Instant Karma
Instinct Records
Intec Digital
International DeeJay Gigolo Records
Italians Do It Better

J
Jahtari
Jarring Effects
Jive Electro

K
KLF Communications
Kinetic Records
Kitsuné Music
Kitty-Yo
Kompakt Records
Kontor Records
Kranky
Kreislauf

L
Lo Recordings 
Luaka Bop
LuckyMe

M
Mau5trap
Macro
Mad Decent
Magnanimous Records
Magnatune
Marian Records
Marine Parade Records
Mass mvmnt
Masters of Hardcore
Mego
Memento Materia
Merck Records
Metal Blade Records
Metalheadz
Metropolis Records
Mille Plateaux
Ministry of Sound Records
Minus
Mo' Wax
Mode Records
Modular Recordings
Mole Listening Pearls
Monstercat
Moonshine Music
Morr Music
Moving Shadow
Mush Records
Musicor Records
Mute

N
n5MD
Nardis Records
Network Records
Nexsound
Newhouse Records
Nextera
Night Slugs
Nilaihah Records
Ninja Tune
NoCopyrightSounds
Noh Poetry Records
Nothing Records
Nova Zembla
Novamute Records
Ntone
Nukleuz

O
Off Beat
Old Europa Cafe
Om Records
On-U Sound Records
One Little Indian
Ophelia Records
Or Records
Origo Sound
Organized Nature
Ostgut Ton
Out of Line Music
Owsla

P
Pacific Front Recordings
Pangea Recordings
PC Music
Pendragon Records
Perfecto Records
Perlon
Phantasy Sound
Planet Mu
Plastic Raygun
Plastiq Musiq
Platipus Records
Play It Again Sam
Plug Research
Plus 8
POF Music
Pork Recordings
Positiva Records
Positron! Records
Prikosnovénie
Psy-Harmonics
Purple Music Switzerland

R
R&S Records
Radikal Records
Ragged Flag
Ram Records
Raster-Noton
React Records
Red Melon Records
Reinforced Records
Reflective Records
Renaissance
Rephlex Records
Resist Music
Revealed Recordings
Rikos Records
Rocket Girl
Rob's House Records
Rotterdam Records
Rotters Golf Club
Roulé
Rune Grammofon

S
Sacred Bones
Sähkö Recordings
Samadhi Sound
Saw Recordings
Scantraxx
Scantraxx Evolutionz
Scantraxx Italy
Scantraxx Reloaded
Scantraxx Special
Section 44 Records
Seed Records
Several Reasons
Shitkatapult
Sigma Editions
Sinnbus
Skam Records
Skint Records
Sky Records
Smalltown Supersound
Smash The House
Soleilmoon
Soma Quality Recordings
Some Bizzare Records
Sonar Kollektiv
Spectral Sound
Spinnin' Deep
Spinnin' Records
Spirit Zone Records
Steel Tiger Records
Stmpd Rcrds
Studio !K7
Subconscious Communications
Subplate Records
Suburban Base
Sutemos
Sweat it Out

T
Ten12 Records
Text Records
Thinner
Third Mind Records
Threshold House
Thrill Jockey Records
Thrive Records
Tigerbeat6
Tigersushi Records
Time Unlimited
Tino Corp.
Toast Hawaii
Tokyo Dawn Records
Too Pure
Touch Music
Transmission Communications
Traum Schallplatten
Tresor
Tribe Records
Trickdisc Recordings
Tru Thoughts
Twisted Records (UK)
Twisted Records (US)

U
Ugly Nephew Records
Ultimae Records
Ultra Records
Unidisc Music Inc.
Union City Recordings
Utopia Records

V
V/Vm Test Records
Vandit
Vendlus Records
Victory Records
Visage Records
Vision Quest Records
Voices of Wonder
Volition Records

W
Wall of Sound
Warp Records
Wax Trax! Records
Werk Discs
West End Records
Why Not Records
Work It Baby
Work Records
WOLV Records
WTII Records

X
XL Recordings

Y
Yoshitoshi Recordings
Young formerly Young Turks from 2006 - April 2021

Z
Zoth Ommog Records
ZYX Music

See also

 List of record labels
 List of independent UK record labels

Electronic